The Idomas are people that primarily inhabit the lower western areas of Benue State, Nigeria, and some of them can be found in Taraba State, Cross Rivers State, Enugu State, Kogi State and Nasarawa State in Nigeria.  The Idoma language is classified in the Akweya subgroup of the Idomoid languages of the Volta–Niger family, which include Igede, Alago, Agatu, Etulo, Ete, Akweya (Akpa) and Yala languages of Benue, Nasarawa, Kogi, Enugu, and Northern Cross River states. The Akweya subgroup is closely related to the Yatye-Akpa sub-group. The bulk of the territory is inland, south of river Benue, some seventy-two kilometres east of its confluence with River Niger. The Idoma tribe are known to be 'warriors' and 'hunters' of class, but hospitable and peace-loving. The greater part of Idoma land remained largely unknown to the West until the 1920s, leaving much of the colourful traditional culture of the Idoma intact. The population of the Idomas is estimated to be about 3.5 million. The Idoma people have a traditional ruler called the Och'Idoma who is the head of the Idoma Area Traditional Council. This was introduced by the British. Each community has its own traditional chief such as the Ad'Ogbadibo of Orokam, Chief D.E Enenche. The Palace of the Och'Idoma is located at Otukpo, Benue State. The present Och'Idoma, HRM, Elaigwu Odogbo John, the 5th Och'Idoma of the Idoma People was installed on the 30th of June, 2022 following the passing of his Predecessor HRH Agabaidu Elias Ikoyi Obekpa who ruled from 1996 to October 2021. Past Och'Idomas also include: HRH, Agabaidu Edwin Ogbu, who reigned from 1996 to 1997, HRH, Abraham Ajene Okpabi of Igede descent who ruled from 1960 to 1995 and HRH, Agabaidu Ogiri Oko whose reign took place between 1948 and 1959.

Origin

Traditional history of Idoma people
Origin:

The history of the Idoma people precedes the history of Benue State (created 1976) and the history of the Republic of Nigeria (created 1960). Oral tradition and dance is the primary method through which history has been passed in Idomaland and is considered a central cultural institution. From a young age, Idoma children usually learn from their elder's stories of old and were brought up around extended families, which make multiple historical resources available. When prompted Idomas generally will proudly tell you where they are from, and it’s not uncommon for Idoma to be able to recite at least four generations of their progenitors. Historically, being unable to answer the emblematic question “Who is your father?” disqualified one from important roles and titles in Idomaland. Quite naturally, a number of villages trace origins to single ancestors and further, several Idoma groups trace their heritage to one common ancestor, considered the “father” of the different groups.
According to traditional history, Iduh, the father of the Idoma had several children who each established different areas. Hence the expression: “Iduh the father of Idoma.”
“Iduh the father of Idoma
Iduh who begot all the Idoma
He also begot the following children:
Ananawoogeno who begot the children of Igwumale;
Olinaogwu who begot the people of Ugboju;
Idum who begot the people of Adoka;
Agabi who begot the people of Otukpo;
Eje who begot the people of Oglewu;
Ebeibi who begot the people of Umogidi in Adoka, Edeh who begot the people of Edumoga and
Ode who begot the people of Yala ”
While there may be some truth to the above, the Idoma cannot be said to have a unitary origin. Many Idoma groups and village subsets have their own histories complete with stories about how their people arrived at their current location. The Otukpa people descended from three ancestors: Owuno, Ameh-Ochagbaha and Oodo. The first two were brothers who migrated from Idah in Igalaland while Oodo migrated from Igbo land. As one can imagine, the ever-changing movement of people through time makes it difficult to study Idoma history. There are some Idomas who are originally Igbos and heavily intermarried with the Northern fringes of Igboland.

Scholarly history
Scholars have combined oral history with genealogical data and analysis of kinship totems to trace the roots of the Idoma people as a whole.
One notable Idoma scholar E.O. Erim cites genealogical data, collected from most modern groups in Idoma suggesting that they derive from several ethnic groups, each with a different historical origin. Furthermore, the available genealogies indicate the existence of diverse ethnic groups who descended from ancestors other than Idu. In several of these cases, the claim of common descent is backed by both extensive genealogical connections and possession of common kinship totems. Erim contends that while Idu was certainly a migration leader—he was not the “father” of the Idoma in the sense implied in the above traditions. These two considerations make it difficult to simply accept the view that every group in Idomaland is descended from Idu.

Many Idoma kindred claims an ancestral homeland called Apa, north-east of present-day Idomaland due to pressures of Northern invaders as recently as 300 years ago. The historical Apa was part of the ancient Kwararafa Kingdom (Okolofa Kingdom), a confederacy of several peoples. Informants in other ethnic groups have corroborated the existence of this kingdom, chiefly the Jukun who also believe they once ruled a confederacy called Kwararafa. In the Hausa book Kano Chronicle it is mentioned that Zaria, under Queen Amina conquered all towns as far as Kwarafara in the 15th century. At present, there is a Local Government Area in Benue State called Apa and is said to be the home of those who made the first migration from the historical kingdom. For many Idoma nationalists today, the name Apa elicits sentiments of past glory, and some in the political sphere have gone as far as suggesting it should become the name of a new Idoma state.

Other scholars point to historical and linguistic evidence that suggests that Idoma have ties with the Igala people to the west, concluding that the two nations came from a common ancestor. Angulu(1981) note that Igala and Igbo have important historical, ancestral and cultural relationships. Eri is said to be the original legendary cultural head of the Umu-eri, a subgroup of the Igbo people. Eri migrated from the Igala area and established a community in the middle of Anambra river valley (at Eri-aka) in Aguleri where he married two wives. The first wife, Nneamakụ, bore him five children. The first was Agulu, the founder of Aguleri (The ancestral head of Eri Kingdom clans) (the Ezeora dynasty that has produced 34 kings till date in Enugwu Aguleri), the second was Menri, the founder of Umunri / Kingdom of Nri, followed by Onugu, the founder of Igbariam and Ogbodulu, the founder of Amanuke. The fifth one was a daughter called Iguedo, who is said to have borne the founders of Nteje, and Awkuzu, Ogbunike, Umuleri, Nando and Ogboli in Onitsha. As one of the children of Eri, Menri migrated from Aguleri, which was and still is, the ancestral temple of the entire Umu-Eri (Umu-Eri and Umu-Nri). His second wife Oboli begot Ọnọja, the only son who founded the Igala Kingdom in Kogi State. Among this group, there are those who believe both ethnic groups fled the same kingdom at some point in history. Many traditional Idoma spiritual chants and “secret” tongues spoken during traditional ceremonies are actually Igala dialects and there are some Idoma themselves who assert their Igala ancestry. There are yet other Idoma groups notably in the southern regions, which claim their ancestors arrived at their present location from the Northern fringes of Igboland as a result of land disputes. Scholars believe these people had most likely fled Apa too, settled and resettled.

As suggested, a number of factors make it difficult to study Idoma historical origins of the Idoma people as a whole. In any event, it could be said that despite their heterogeneous origins, trading, marriage, language and other interactions among the Idoma have cultivated traditions and shaped a rich cultural identity distinctly their own.

Outside of Benue
The popular idea is that the Idoma are an ethnolinguistic group primarily found in the western areas of Benue State, Nigeria. This is because they are the second largest group in the state and occupy 9 local government areas (L.G.A.’s) which are: Ado, Agatu, Apa, Obi, Ohimini, Ogbadibo, Oju, Okpokwu and Otukpo. Aside from the western parts of Benue, this tribe have settlements in other parts of the country, including Taraba, Nassarawa, Kogi, Enugu and the Cross River States. The men are obliged by tradition to pound yam for their wives, Unlike other cultures where the woman is expected to perform all culinary chores, the Idoma men are not always exempted.

Traditional colours

The traditional colours of the Idoma people are red and black stripes. This has only been around since the 1980s to foster a distinct Idoma identity.

Traditional dance
The most famous traditional dance of the Idoma people is known as Ogirinya dance. It is a highly energetic dance that requires jumping (at regular intervals) on the toes in short period of time. A video of the Ogirinya dance can be viewed on YouTube. Dancers putting on the Idoma attire (traditional colours) can be seen in both links.

Traditional food (Okoho soup)
The Idoma people are known for their love of food, as there is an annual food festival in Benue State to celebrate women and the various traditional cuisines.
Most popular among their delicacies is the Okoho soup which is made with the peculiar Okoho plant, bush meat and many other ingredients.

Traditional religion
With the advent of Christianity, Islam, and other foreign religions, the traditional belief systems of most ethnic groups in the country has been influenced by western practices.
However, a majority of the Idoma people still believe strongly in the Alekwu, which is seen as the ancestral spirits – a link between the living and the dead. They host an annual "Aje Alekwu" festival where traditional religious practitioners commune and make sacrifices in the worship of their ancestors across the land.

The Idomas have a strong attachment to the Alekwu-spirit of the ancestors which is believed to stand as an invisible watchdog of the family and communities while checkmating vices like adultery, theft and murder.

Marriage
While the marriage rites and customs of the Idoma people is not unlike that of the Igbos and some other south-eastern cultures, there are specific aspects that clearly distinguish their tradition.
In some Idoma subcultures, the groom and his family have to present the bride with a rooster and some money on the marriage day after the bride price has already been paid. If she accepts, it is a sign of approval and disinterest if she rejects the gift. While there are no certain reasons to justify the need for a rooster, it remains an interesting part of the ceremony.

Notable Idoma people

 2baba Innocent Idibia, musician
 Lawrence Onoja, former military governor of Plateau State and Katsina State, Nigeria and Principal Staff Officer 
 Jerry Agada, former State Minister of Education, author and essayist
 David Mark, former Nigerian Senate President
 Monday Riku Morgan, Air Vice Marshal, former Chief of Defense Intelligence
 Abba Moro, former Benue state Algon Chairman, former Minister of Interior, Senator, educationist
 Moses Ochonu, author, historian
 Audu Ogbeh, former Minister of Communications, former National Chairman of PDP, former Minister of Agriculture & Rural Development
 Terry G, Nigerian musician
 Susan Peters, Nollywood actress,
 Daniel Amokachi, former Super Eagle player
 Monica Ogah, Nigerian Singer and winner, MTN Project Fame, Season 4

References

Sources 
 Abraham, R.C., The Idoma Language. Idoma Wordlists. Idoma Chrestomathy. Idoma Proverbs. Published by the Author on behalf of the Idoma Native Administration, Government of Nigeria. 1951.
 Ethnologue Language Tree: Idomoid;
 Armstrong, Robert G. 1983. The Idomoid languages of the Benue and Cross-River valleys.;
 Bennett, Patrick R. & Sterk, Jan P. (1977) "South Central Niger-Congo: A reclassification" Studies in African Linguistics 8: Vol. 13, No. 1, pp. 241–273;
 journalofwestafricanlanguages.org

External links

 
Ethnic groups in Nigeria
Idomoid languages